Summi may refer to :

Summi maeroris is one of several peace encyclicals of Pope Pius XII focusing in particular on the dangers to peace during the Holy Year.
Summi Pontificatus is an encyclical of Pope Pius XII published on October 20, 1939.